Robert David Green (born September 10, 1970) is a former American football running back in the National Football League (NFL)for the Washington Redskins, the Minnesota Vikings, and the Chicago Bears.  He played college football at the College of William & Mary.  He recorded career totals of 1,038 yards rushing on 221 carries, 596 yards receiving, and 256 yards of kick returns in six seasons.

He is currently a Health Issues and Personal Fitness teacher at Oxon Hill High School in Oxon Hill, Maryland. He also has two daughters and two sons.

References

1970 births
Living people
American football running backs
Chicago Bears players
Minnesota Vikings players
Washington Redskins players
William & Mary Tribe football players
High school football coaches in Maryland
Players of American football from Washington, D.C.